Mok-dong Station is a railway station on Seoul Subway Line 5 in Yangcheon-gu, Seoul.

Station layout

References

Railway stations opened in 1996
Seoul Metropolitan Subway stations
Metro stations in Yangcheon District